Sola gratia, meaning by grace alone, is one of the five solae and consists in the belief that salvation comes by divine grace or "unmerited favor" only, not as something earned or deserved by the sinner. It is a Christian theological doctrine held by some Protestant Christian denominations, in particular the Lutheran and Reformed traditions of Protestantism, propounded to summarise the Protestant Reformers' basic soteriology during the Reformation.

History
During the Protestant Reformation, Lutheran and Calvinist theologians generally believed that the Catholic doctrine of the means of grace was a mixture of reliance upon the grace of God and confidence in the merits of one's own works performed in love, pejoratively called "legalism". These Reformers posited that salvation is entirely comprehended in God's gifts (that is, God's act of free grace), dispensed by the Holy Spirit according to the redemptive work of Jesus Christ alone.

Consequently, they argued that a sinner is not accepted by God on account of the change wrought in the believer by God's grace, and indeed, that the believer is accepted without any regard for the merit of his works—for no one deserves salvation; at the same time, they condemned the extreme of antinomianism, a doctrine that argues that if someone is saved, he/she has no need to live a holy life, given that salvation is already "in the bag". It is also linked to the five points of Calvinism.

The Eastern Orthodox Churches affirm salvation by grace, teaching:

Being synergists, those of Wesleyan–Arminian soteriology, such as Methodists, take a different approach to sola gratia than Lutherans and Reformed Christians, holding that God, through prevenient grace, reaches out to all individuals though they have the free will to cooperate with that grace or reject it.

Recent activity
In November 1999, the Lutheran World Federation and the Pontifical Council for Promoting Christian Unity issued the "Joint Declaration on the Doctrine of Justification" that said, "By grace alone, in faith in Christ's saving work and not because of any merit on our part, we are accepted by God and receive the Holy Spirit, who renews our hearts while equipping us and calling us to good works."

On July 18, 2006, delegates to the World Methodist Conference voted unanimously to adopt the declaration. The Methodists' resolution said the 1999 agreement "expresses a far-reaching consensus in regard to the theological controversy which was a major cause of the split in Western churches in the 16th century" about salvation.

Some conservative Protestants still believe the differences between their views and those of the Catholics remain substantial, however.  They insist that this agreement does not fully reconcile the differences between the Reformist and Catholic viewpoints on this subject.

See also
Christian views on the Old Covenant
Conditional security
Expounding of the Law
Imparted righteousness
Irresistible grace
Justification (theology)
Law and Gospel
Paul the Apostle and Jewish Christianity
Sanctification in Christianity

References

External links

Articles on the five solas from a conservative Protestant perspective

Five solae
Latin religious words and phrases
Christian terminology